Kendrick Sampson (born March 8, 1988)  is an American actor and activist, best known for his appearances on The Vampire Diaries, Gracepoint, How to Get Away with Murder, The Flash, and his role as Nathan on HBO's Insecure.

Early life
Sampson was born and raised in Houston, Texas, the son of Daphne Smith Sampson and Hoyle Sampson Sr. He is biracial. As a child, Sampson was enrolled in music lessons. Sampson expressed an interest in acting at 10 after he saw a Gap commercial. After finding an agent, Sampson was referred to the Kim Terry Studio in Texas. He began performing in theater productions while attending Elkins High School. Sampson is a devout Christian.

Career
In 2008, Sampson appeared in two episodes of the ABC Family series Greek and followed that up with an episode of CSI: Crime Scene Investigation in 2010. In July 2013, Sampson booked the recurring role of Jesse in the fifth season of The CW series, The Vampire Diaries. In January 2014, Sampson was cast in the role of Dean Iverson in the Fox miniseries, Gracepoint. In November 2014, Sampson starred in the music video for Hayley Kiyoko's song "This Side of Paradise." In early 2015, Sampson shot the pilot for a potential ABC series called The Kingmakers but the series wasn't picked up. In July 2015, Sampson booked the recurring role of Caleb Hapstall in season 2 of ABC's prime time legal drama, How to Get Away with Murder, produced by Shonda Rhimes. From 2018 - 2021 Sampson had a recurring role as Nathan Campbell on Issa Rae created Insecure. Sampson has also started his own production company called Sampson Studios.

Activism 
In May 2019 he founded the organization BLD PWR for new development, empowerment and change within marginalized groups and American society. Following the Murder of George Floyd, Sampson actively participated in and organized Black Lives Matter protests in Los Angeles. During the protests, Sampson reported that police officers shot rubber bullets at him and assaulted him. Sampson called for a one-day strike in Hollywood over the Shooting of Jacob Blake.

In 2020, Sampson collaborated with JusticeLA to create a public service announcement #SuingToSaveLives about the health of people in Los Angeles County Jails amid the COVID-19 pandemic.

Filmography

Film

Television

References

External links
 

Living people
American male television actors
American male film actors
Male actors from Houston
21st-century American male actors
African-American male actors
1988 births
21st-century African-American people
20th-century African-American people